Alejandro Landero Gutiérrez (born 3 May 1975) is a Mexican politician affiliated with the National Action Party. As of 2014 he served as Deputy of the LX Legislature of the Mexican Congress representing the State of Mexico.

References

1975 births
Living people
Politicians from the State of Mexico
National Action Party (Mexico) politicians
21st-century Mexican politicians
Deputies of the LX Legislature of Mexico
Members of the Chamber of Deputies (Mexico) for the State of Mexico